Otto Kerner (February 22, 1884 – December 13, 1952) was a Democratic Attorney General of Illinois and a United States circuit judge of the United States Court of Appeals for the Seventh Circuit.

Education and career
Kerner was born in Chicago, Illinois on February 22, 1884 to Czech immigrants Karel Boromejský Kerner (1852–1912) from Ronov nad Doubravou, and Josefa [née Šejbová] (1855–1921) from Hrazánky. Kerner received a Bachelor of Laws from Lake Forest College in 1905. He was in private practice of law in Chicago from 1905 to 1915. In 1911, Kerner was one of incorporators of the Bohemian Lawyers Association of Chicago. From 1915 to 1927, Kerner was a master in chancery of the Circuit Court of Cook County, Illinois. In 1927, he became a Judge of the Circuit Court of Cook County and in 1931 he became a Judge of the Illinois Appellate Court. In 1932, Kerner became Attorney General of Illinois, a position he held until 1938. He was a member of the Democratic Party.

Legal opinions in regards to the repeal of prohibition
As Illinois Attorney General, Kerner clarified the confusion as to whether liquor could be legally sold in Illinois following the ratification of the Twenty-first Amendment, and subsequent repeal of Prohibition, in December 1933. Kerner opined that the state statute governing the sale of 3.2 percent beer had nothing to do with the sale of liquor and other beverages of more than 3.2 percent after Repeal. As a result of Kerner's opinion, local breweries in Chicago announced that ales, stouts, and porters as strong as 4 and 5 percent would be placed on sale.

Federal judicial service

Kerner received a recess appointment from President Franklin D. Roosevelt on November 21, 1938, to the United States Court of Appeals for the Seventh Circuit, to a new seat authorized by 52 Stat. 584. He was nominated to the same position by President Roosevelt on January 5, 1939. He was confirmed by the United States Senate on February 1, 1939, and received his commission on February 9, 1939.

He remained on the bench until his death in Chicago on December 13, 1952. Kerner was interred at the Bohemian National Cemetery in Chicago.

Family
Kerner married Rosalie [née Chmelíková] (1885-1979) in Chicago in 1907. She was a Czech immigrant from Lišov. Their son Otto Kerner Jr. was twice elected Democratic Governor of Illinois, serving from 1961 to 1968, and also served as a Judge of the Seventh Circuit from 1968 to 1974.

References

Sources
 
 

1884 births
1952 deaths
Burials at Bohemian National Cemetery (Chicago)
Chicago City Council members
Illinois Attorneys General
Illinois Democrats
Judges of the United States Court of Appeals for the Seventh Circuit
United States court of appeals judges appointed by Franklin D. Roosevelt
20th-century American judges
Judges of the Illinois Appellate Court
Lawyers from Chicago
American people of Bohemian descent
Judges of the Circuit Court of Cook County (pre-1964 reorganization)
American people of Czech descent